Events in the year 2017 in Jamaica.

Incumbents
 Monarch: Elizabeth II
 Governor-General: Patrick Allen
 Prime Minister: Andrew Holness
 Chief Justice: Zaila McCalla

Events

Sports
4 to 13 August – Jamaica participated at the 2017 World Championships in Athletics, with 54 competitors in 24 events

Deaths

18 January – Peter Abrahams, novelist, journalist and political commentator (b. 1919).
25 January – Ronnie Davis, reggae singer (b. 1950).
26 January – Lindy Delapenha, footballer and sports journalist (b. 1927).

6 June – Horace Burrell, football executive (b. 1950)

References

 
2010s in Jamaica
Years of the 21st century in Jamaica
Jamaica
Jamaica